The Aboriginal Shire of Kowanyama is a special local government area which is located on western Cape York Peninsula in Queensland, Australia. It is managed under a Deed of Grant in Trust under the Local Government (Community Government Areas) Act 2004.

History
The area originally was set up as the Mitchell River Mission in 1916. Aboriginal people from the region were gradually drawn from their traditional lands into the mission settlement. Language groups associated with countries in the Kowanyama region are Yir-Yoront, Yirrk Thangalkl, Koko Bera and Kunjen (Uw Oykangand and Olkola dialects).

Kunjen (also known as Koko Wanggara, Ngundjan and Olkola) is a language of Western Cape York. The Kunjen language region includes the landscape within the local government boundaries of Kowanyama Community Council and Cook Shire Council.

Yir Yiront (also known as Yiront, Jirjoront, Yir-yiront, and Kokomindjan) is an Australian Aboriginal language. Its traditional language region is in Western Cape York within the local government areas of  Aboriginal Shire of Kowanyama and Shire of Cook, in the catchments of the  Coleman River and Mitchell River. Following the removal of Aboriginal people from their traditional lands, it is also spoken in Pormpuraaw and Kowanyama.

In 1967 the Anglican church were no longer able to sustain their activities in the area as a Church Mission. The Department of Aboriginal and Islander Affairs, a government department, under the Act continued running the affairs of the community.

On 23 July 1987, under the Community Services (Aborigines) Act 1984, a Deed of Grant in Trust was given to the Kowanyama community over the lands in the Mitchell River delta. Like other DOGIT communities of the time, Kowanyama had a town Council elected by Aboriginal people living in the community. The newly formed Kowanyama Council assumed responsibility for implementing certain conditions of the DOGIT. Seven elected Aboriginal residents hold three year terms in office.

Responsibilities
As the Shire operates under the Local Government Act 2009, the Shire Council's responsibilities are the generally the same as other local government in remote Queensland including for fisheries, the alcohol management and even operation of some commercial enterprises.

Community Justice Group 

A Community Justice Group operates within Kowanyama.  This group is made up of respected members in the community.  They meet to discuss issues within the town and make recommendations to Council.

The community also has a Council of Elders, who are consulted by the Kowanyama Council when making community decisions.  The elders operate in conjunction with the Lands Office.

The Lands Office 

The Kowanyama Aboriginal Land and Natural Resources Management Office (KALNRMO) works to promote and facilitate aboriginal management of the natural and cultural resources of Kowanyama country by the people of Kowanyama. Through community consultation and direction, KALNRMO has developed a community development agenda for the Kowanyama region, including:

 Homelands development
 Land and Fisheries Management
 'Tourism and Visitor management
 Kowanyama Ranger Service
 Native Title Claims
 Cultural Resource documentation

Through the initiatives of KALNRMO, the Kowanyama community is widely regarded as a leader in indigenous land management issues. Since 1987, Kowanyama has effected substantial local control over fishing in the Mitchell River Delta, including the closure of some waters to non-Aboriginal fishing under state fisheries legislation. This action, funded through the enterprise income of the Kowanyama Aboriginal Council, has provided Aboriginal people access to the River's fish stocks for their cultural and economic needs. In this way, Aboriginal people can fish and hunt as they have done for many thousands of years.

KALNRMO employs Indigenous rangers as part of a cultural and economic development programme. The Kowanyama Rangers implement land management strategies in many areas of the DOGIT, and, in addition to tourism and visitor management, patrol closed and open waters. The Rangers also observe fisheries regulations, especially for illegal commercial or recreational fishing in closed waters. Beginning in 2007, the Rangers monitor threatened turtle populations and participate in the Carpentaria Ghost Nets Programme to remove debris (primarily fishing nets) discarded into the Gulf of Carpentaria by commercial fishermen from Australia and Indonesia.

Mayors 
 2008–2012: Thomas Farlane Hudson
 2012–2016: Robert Holness
 2016–2020 : Michael Yam
2020–present: Robert Michael Sands

See also 

 Kowanyama, Queensland

References

External links
 University of Queensland: Queensland Places: Kowanyama Aboriginal Shire Council
  PDF Map including detail of Kowanyama DOGIT Lands

 
Local government areas of Queensland
Aboriginal communities in Queensland
Far North Queensland
1987 establishments in Australia